Topton is an unincorporated community in Cherokee County, North Carolina, United States. Topton has a post office with ZIP code 28781.

References

Unincorporated communities in Cherokee County, North Carolina
Unincorporated communities in North Carolina